Quest Channel is a channel leading southwestward from Adelaide Anchorage between Hibbert Rock and Henkes Islands, off the south end of Adelaide Island. It was named by the United Kingdom Antarctic Place-Names Committee (UK-APC) after the survey motorboat which charted this area in 1963.

See also
Lord Bank

References

Channels of the Southern Ocean
Straits of Adelaide Island